Féronstrée (Liègean Walloon - È Fèronstrèye) is a major street in central Liège, linking place du Marché to place des Déportés. Its name refers to the ironworkers once based on it. Also previously known as the Grand'rue, it is the site of the Ansembourg Museum, Curtius Museum, Bibliothèque Ulysse Capitaine and St Bartholomew's Church. Henry IV, Holy Roman Emperor died at what is now number 6 on the street in 1106.

Bibliography
 Théodore Gobert, Liège à travers les âges, Liège, Georges Thone, 1924 and 1930, 3rd and 4th editions., 6 quarto volumes (1st and 2nd editions 1884 and 1901 under the title Les rues de Liége, 4 quarto volumes) (OCLC 645720856)

Streets in Belgium
Geography of Liège